Fingertip (Season 2) is an original Tamil-Language television series directed by Srinivasan Shivakar starring Prasanna, Aparana Balamurali, Regina Cassandra, Vinoth Kishan, Kanna Ravi, and Sharath Ravi. Fingertip Season 2 premiered on June 17, 2022, on ZEE5.

Plot 
The lives of six individuals get severely affected by the ever-changing digital space. While some are predators, some are victims of cybercrime and digital depression.

Cast 

 Prasanna
 Regina Cassandra
 Aparna Balamurali
 Vinoth Kishan
 Sharath Ravi
 Kanna Ravi
 G. Marimuthu
 Kitty
 Jeeva Ravi

References

External links 
 
 Fingertip  at ZEE5

ZEE5 original programming
Tamil-language web series
Tamil-language crime television series
Tamil-language thriller television series
2022 Tamil-language television series debuts
Television series about social media